Omar Kavak is a Dutch / Turkish footballer who plays as a left winger. He is currently without a club after he was released by FC Emmen.

External links
 Voetbal International profile 
 

1988 births
Living people
Dutch footballers
Association football forwards
Go Ahead Eagles players
FC Emmen players
Eredivisie players
Eerste Divisie players
Footballers from Enschede
SV Zwaluwen Wierden players
SC Genemuiden players